Tesfaye, also transliterated as Tesfay and Tesfai, is a male name of Ethiopian origin that may refer to:

Tesfaye Abera (born 1992), Ethiopian long-distance runner
Tesfaye Alebachew (born 1988), Ethiopian footballer
Tesfaye Bramble (born 1980), English footballer playing internationally for Montserrat
 Tesfaye Cooper (born 1998), American criminal and perpetrator of the 2017 Chicago torture incident hate crime
Tesfaye Dinka (1939–2016), former Prime Minister of Ethiopia
Tesfaye Eticha (born 1974), Ethiopian marathon runner competing for Switzerland
Tesfaye Gebre Kidan (1935?–2004), Ethiopian army general and former President of Ethiopia
Tesfai Gebreab, Eritrean diplomat and political prisoner
Tesfaye Gessesse (born 1937), Ethiopian theatre actor and director
Tesfaye Jifar (born 1976), Ethiopian former marathon runner
Tesfaye Tafa (born 1962), Ethiopian former marathon runner
Tesfaye Tafese (born 1986), Ethiopian footballer
Tesfaye Tola (born 1974), Ethiopian former marathon runner
Abel "The Weeknd" Tesfaye (born 1990), Canadian musician and producer
Aseged Tesfaye (1970/1971-2017), Ethiopian former professional footballer
Daniel Tesfaye (born 19??), former Ethiopian cyclist
Mattias Tesfaye (born 1981), Danish politician
Selam Tesfaye (born 1993), Ethiopian film actress
Seyoum Tesfaye (born 1989), Ethiopian professional footballer
Roman Tesfaye (born 1968), former First Lady of Ethiopia

Amharic-language names